Vincent T. Cullers (1924 – October 4, 2003) was an American designer, advertising professional, and civil rights activist. Inspired by the civil rights movement in the United States, he founded Vince Cullers Advertising in 1956. He was a pioneer in advertising targeting the Black American population.

Early 
Vince was born in Chicago in 1924 in the Bronzeville neighborhood. He was the son of Samuel and Letitia Terry Cullers. Vince had one brother, Roosevelt, and one sister, Althea. He attended DuSable High School, where he was an American football player, and upon graduation he entered Art Institute of Chicago.

As World War II broke out and the United States entered the conflict, Vince enlisted in the Marine Corps where he became a combat artist serving in the South Pacific region. While illustrating combat scenes and everyday life in battle, a fellow soldier, Eugene, showed him a picture of his cousin, Marian Barnett from Champaign, Illinois, with whom Vince fell in love. Upon returning to Chicago, the two were formally introduced, began dating, and married, having two sons, Vincent (Terry) Jr. and Jeffery.

By this time Vince had a good portfolio and began looking for work as an illustrator at various advertising agencies in Chicago and New York. However, segregation and racism prevented him from getting the job he wanted. According to his son, Jeffery:

Cullersworked as a freelance illustrator until in 1953 he landed a position as art director for Ebony magazine, which earned him the money he needed to start his own business. It was the height of the civil rights movement. In 1954, the Supreme Court ruled in Brown v. Board of Education, where it recognized the unconstitutionality of racial segregation in schools. A year later, Rosa Parks' refusal to give up her bus seat led to a boycott of buses in Montgomery, Alabama.

Vince Cullers Advertising 
In 1956 Cullers founded Vince Cullers Advertising. While he handled the artwork, his wife Marian was responsible for administration, later becoming vice president. The mission of the agency was to open up the advertising market to the African-American audience and to change the way advertising was done for this audience.

For years, the agency was a creative hub and school for young advertising students. Vince became a teacher and employer to many of them, due to the lack of black trained professionals in the market. His agency changed the way advertising was targeted to the African American population. Instead of using strategies created by Whites, he created strategies specifically for the Black population.

The beginning was modest for the agency. In its founding year, revenues were less than ten thousand dollars. White clients were reluctant to invest in advertising created and aimed at blacks. However, the existence of the agency itself was already breaking down barriers and prejudices for the time. In 1968 a major contract was signed with Lorillard Tobacco Company. Cullers created a campaign for them starring a black man wearing a traditional dashiki clothing. Next, Johnson Products Company hired Vince for their Afro-Sheen campaign, a line of hair products for black people, famous for creating the slogan "Wantu Wazuri".

Other clients served by the agency were Pizza Hut, Sears, and Kellogg's, among others. In 1973, the annual revenue was already US$2.5 million. In 1990 it was US$20 million. In addition to print and television advertising, the agency also helped produce TV programs, such as "Soul Train TV" and the radio program "Lu's Notebook", which was on the air for ten years.

Last years 
In 1997 the agency went through a restructuring. Vince handed over the helm of the business to his youngest son, Jeffery Cullers, but continued as president. In 2002, due to health problems, Vince retired and passed the full command to his son.

Death 
Vince died on October 4, 2003, at age 79, at Kindred Chicago Lakeshore Hospital from heart failure. His body was buried at Lincoln Cemetery.

References 

2003 deaths
1924 births
African-American designers
People from Chicago
American advertising people
21st-century African-American people
United States Marine Corps personnel of World War II
African Americans in World War II
African-American United States Navy personnel